Bothriomyrmex breviceps is a species of ant in the genus Bothriomyrmex. Described by Santschi in 1919, the species can be found in Tunisia and Algeria.

References

Bothriomyrmex
Hymenoptera of Africa
Insects of North Africa
Insects described in 1919